John Wilbur Lickert (born April 4, 1960 in Pittsburgh, Pennsylvania) is a former catcher in Major League Baseball. He played one game with the Boston Red Sox in 1981, and was credited with one put out and no official at bats.

Sources

1960 births
Living people
Major League Baseball catchers
Baseball players from Pittsburgh
Boston Red Sox players
Bristol Red Sox players
Elmira Pioneers players
Pawtucket Red Sox players
Richmond Braves players
Winston-Salem Red Sox players